The University of Maryland College of Behavioral and Social Sciences is one of the 13 schools and colleges at the University of Maryland, College Park. With 10 departments, it is one of the largest colleges at the university, with three in ten University of Maryland undergraduates receiving their degree from the college. 45 research centers also are located in the College. Its social science programs are collectively ranked 10th in the United States by the Faculty Scholarly Productivity Index, and 18th in the world by the Institute of Higher Education at Shanghai Jiao Tong University.

History
 
The College of Behavioral and Social Sciences began as "The School of Liberal Arts" in 1919, and was headquartered in Morrill Hall; Frederic E. Lee served as the school's first dean. In the 1920s, it became "The College of Arts and Sciences," with five separate divisions. In 1936, the college moved into the newly completed College of Arts and Sciences Building, which was renamed Francis Scott Key Hall in 1955. In the 1940s, the departments of Economics, Geography and Government & Politics moved into The College of Business and Public Administration.

In 1972, the College of Arts and Sciences and the College of Business and Public Administration combined to become the new "Division of Behavioral and Social Sciences", one of five divisions in the university. In 1986, the five divisions split into fourteen colleges, and The College of Behavioral and Social Sciences was formed. The college has been headquartered in Millard E. Tydings Hall since 1993.

Departments

Undergraduate opportunities

CIVICUS
CIVICUS is a two-year living and learning undergraduate program in the College of Behavioral and Social Sciences, which links academic coursework together with participation in internships and community service to provide an experience of civil service engagement for participants (known as CIVICUS Associates). CIVICUS Associates live together in Somerset Hall (located in the North Hill Community), which was renovated in 1999 for the CIVICUS Living and Learning Program. Somerset Hall also houses the program's offices and hosts CIVICUS classes. The hall is designed with several study and social lounges to enhance students' living and learning experience. Somerset is located centrally on campus making the walk to classes, the dining hall, McKeldin Library, and the Stamp Student Union quick and convenient. All the rooms in Somerset are air-conditioned. Most of the rooms are doubles with a few singles, triples, and quads scattered throughout the building. In addition, there is a computer lab and laundry facility located on the ground floor.

For students entering CIVICUS in the fall of their freshman year, the CIVICUS classes students are required to take in their first semester consist of a 1-credit class called CIVICUS Student and the University (BSCV181) and a 3-credit class called Introduction to CIVICUS (BSCV191). In their second semester, students take a 1-credit class called CIVICUS and Service Learning (BSCV182) and a 3 credit class called Introduction to Contemporary Social Problems (SOCY105). In their third semester in the CIVICUS program, students take a 3-credit class called Leadership in a Multicultural Society. In the last semester in the program students take the CIVICUS Capstone 3 credit class (BSCV302) that gives them academic credit for their CIVICUS Internship. A student can take a 1 credit class instead if the student is getting academic credit from another academic program.  The creator and current director of the program is Dr. Korey Rothman.
In addition to the in-class requirements, CIVICUS associates are responsible for completing four service projects per semester, a long term service project, and an internship. Associates also participate in an additional two community days of service, once per semester. Students are able to participate in a wide variety of service activities, ranging from those on campus, to those in the surrounding counties and Washington, D.C. The program is based on the five principles of civil society: citizenship, leadership, community building in a diverse society, scholarship, and community service-learning. CIVICUS is a program for enthusiastic, motivated, and dedicated students who want to get involved with the campus and the local community to make a positive difference. CIVICUS comprises a diverse group of student leaders whose distinct personalities, perspectives, and backgrounds enrich class discussions, service projects, and the conversations throughout the halls of Somerset. This camaraderie continues even after CIVICUS students have completed their citation, as many CIVICUS juniors and seniors return regularly to Somerset and remain involved with the program. In addition to being involved with the CIVICUS community, many of the students are actively involved in the university and local communities.

University of Maryland freshmen applicants whose application materials suggest they possess significant levels of leadership, involvement, and ambition are invited to join the program. A total of 100 associates are in the program at a time.

Maryland Mock Trial team
The University of Maryland Mock Trial Team is an academic program and student organization which engages in intercollegiate mock trial competition. Maryland Mock Trial first began competing in the 1989-1990 academic year, and though based out of the Department of Government and Politics in the College of Behavioral and Social Sciences, students from every UMD college, department, and major are eligible to join.
Maryland Mock Trial has won five national championships (2008, 2000, 1998, 1996, 1992), which ranks the most of any university, and was also the national runner-up in 1992 and 1993.

Faculty
There are two endowed chairs within the College of Behavioral and Social Sciences: the Anwar Sadat Chair for Peace and Development, currently held by Shibley Telhami, and the Bahá'í Chair for World Peace, currently held by John Grayzel, are at the Center for International Development and Conflict Management, which is a center within the Department of Government and Politics.

Notable faculty in the College include:
Gar Alperovitz (Department of Government and Politics)
Charles Butterworth (Department of Government and Politics)
Patricia Hill Collins (Department of Sociology)
Ruth DeFries (Department of Geography), member of the National Academy of Sciences and MacArthur Fellow
Ted Robert Gurr (Department of Government and Politics)
Mark P. Leone (Department of Anthropology)
George Ritzer (Department of Sociology)
Jehan Al Sadat (Center for International Development and Conflict Management)
Thomas Schelling (Department of Economics), winner of the Nobel Prize in Economics and member of the National Academy of Sciences
Shibley Telhami (Department of Government and Politics)
Vladimir Tismăneanu (Department of Government and Politics)

Notable former faculty members include:
Oliver Edwin Baker (Department of Geography)
John W. Dorsey (Department of Economics)
Parris Glendening (Department of Government and Politics)
Edward B. Montgomery (Department of Economics)
Mancur Olson (Department of Economics)
Carmen Reinhart (Department of Economics)
John W. Snow (Department of Economics)
Ron Walters (Department of Government and Politics)

Notable alumni

Other prominent alumni include: Eric F. Billings, Chairman and Chief Executive Officer of FBR Capital Markets Corporation; John Dryzek, social and political theorist; Robert W. Jordan, former U.S. Ambassador to Saudi Arabia; Kori Schake, former director for Defense Strategy and Requirements on the National Security Council; Charles Schultze, former Chairman of the United States Council of Economic Advisers; and Torrey Smith, a retired football wide receiver and 2-time Super Bowl champion.

See also
Center for American Politics and Citizenship
List of Sadat Lecture for Peace Speakers
Minorities at Risk

Notes

References

External links
BSOS Website
CIVICUS Website
Pathways to Peace at the University of Maryland

 
Behavioral and Social Sciences
Liberal arts colleges at universities in the United States
Behavioral and Social Sciences
Psychology departments in the United States
Social sciences organizations
Educational institutions established in 1919
1919 establishments in Maryland